Garhi-Malhara is a town and a nagar panchayat in Chhatarpur district  in the state of Madhya Pradesh, India.

The lake side view looks like a hill station.

Demographics
 India census, Garhi-Malhara had a population of 12,962. Males constitute 53% of the population and females 47%. Garhi-Malhara has an average literacy rate of 53%, lower than the national average of 59.5%: male literacy is 61%, and female literacy is 45%. In Garhi-Malhara, 16% of the population is under 6 years of age.

References

Princely states of Bundelkhand
Bundelkhand
Chhatarpur